The 2000 Big 12 Conference football season represented the 5th season of Big 12 conference football, taking place during the 2000 NCAA Division I-A football season. The season began with non-conference play on Saturday, August 26, 2000. Conference play began on Saturday, September 30, 2000.

At the conclusion of the regular season, Kansas State won the North Division championship with a 11–3 (6–2) record. Oklahoma finished atop the South Division standings, with a perfect regular season 11–0 (8–0).

In the 2000 Big 12 Championship Game, the Oklahoma Sooners, narrowly beat the Kansas State Wildcats by a score of 27–24 in Kansas City, Missouri. With the win, the Sooners advance to the BCS National Championship Game. Kansas State was placed in the Cotton Bowl Classic. A total of 7 Big 12 teams went to bowl games in 2000.

Oklahoma won the BCS National Championship Game at the 2001 Orange Bowl, defeating Florida State, 13–2, in Miami Gardens.

Head coaches

Regular season

Week 1

Week 2

Week 3

Week 4

Week 5

Week 6

Week 7

Week 8

Week 9

Week 10

Week 11

Week 12

Week 13

Week 14

Championship Game

Bowl Games

Bowl games

Rankings are from AP rankings.  All times Central Time Zone.  Big 12 teams shown in bold.

References